() is the abbreviation from Battalion commander. It was a military rank in the Red Army from 1918 to 1935. At that time it was roughly equivalent to the rank of captain.

Etymologically, the word Komandir (Commander) is sandwiched with the word Batalyona ([of the] Battalion) to make Kombat, similar to compound words in the English language. Combined words like Kombat were commonly used by the Soviet government during the Stalin era such as Komdiv (Division Commander), Komkor (Corps Commander), Kombrig (Brigade Commander), and Komandarm (Army Commander).

In popular culture, as for the 50th anniversary of Victory Day, folk rock band Lyube made the World War II song "Kombat" in 1995, which won cultural significance and many awards, leading even Vladimir Putin to commend the band.

It is also an informal Russian language abbreviation for the military commander's position for an officer in command of a battalion or an artillery battery.

See also
 Ranks and insignia of the Red Army and Navy 1918–1935

References 

Military ranks of the Soviet Union